Shentangqiao is a metro station on Line 2  and Line 19 of the Hangzhou Metro in China. It is located in the Gongshu District of Hangzhou. The transfer corridor between Line 2 and Line 19 was opened on November 1, 2022.

Gallery

References

Railway stations in Zhejiang
Railway stations in China opened in 2017
Hangzhou Metro stations